Arnold Cassola is a Maltese and Italian independent politician, professor, author and editor of various books and academic papers. Cassola is a professor in Comparative Literature at the University of Malta. He has held elective office and political posts in Malta, Italy and at a European level. Cassola served as leader of Democratic Alternative from 2013 until 2017.

Maltese politics 

Cassola was one of the co-founders in 1989 of Democratic Alternative, the green party in Malta. Between 1990 and 1997, he was the Party's delegate to the European Green Party (EGP). He unsuccessfully contested all national elections with the Party since 1992. Between 1994 and 1997, he served as local councillor in Swieqi. His best result in Maltese politics was in the 2004 election for the European Parliament when he obtained 9.33% (or 23,000 votes) of the first-preference votes, just failing to be elected one of Malta's five MEPs.

In July 2008, Cassola was elected Chairperson of the Party after the resignation of Harry Vassallo. In the second elections held in Malta for the European Parliament in 2009, Cassola stood as candidate once more together with another candidate for the Party, Yvonne Ebejer Arqueros. This time the Party polled only 2.34% of the vote. In view of the result, Cassola resigned as Party Chairperson.

However, he remained active in the Party a spokesperson and unsuccessfully contested the 2013 general election. Party Chairperson Michael Briguglio resigned after this election and Cassola was voted again as party Chairperson until he resigned in 2017.

Cassola resigned from the party in February 2019 due to differences between himself and the Executive Committee on the issue of abortion.

European Green Party 

Cassola was elected member of the Executive Committee of the European Green Party in 1997, eventually being elected Secretary General of the Executive Committee of the (EGP). In the latter post, he served between 1999 and 2006. Between 2001 and 2006, he was one of the three European representatives on the Global Greens Coordination. He has been a European Union electoral observer in various countries in Africa and South America, and editor of the official organ of the European Greens "Green Update" (since 1998).

Italian politics 

In Italy, Cassola was a deputy in the Italian Chamber of Deputies elected by Italian expatriates in the Europe constituency with the left-right-centre coalition L'Unione between 2006 and 2008.

Honours 

Cassola was made Knight of the Order of Merit of the Italian Republic in 2003 by the Italian President Carlo Azeglio Ciampi.

References

External links

Profile on Google Scholar
Profile on OAR@UM
Profile on ORCID

Leaders of political parties in Malta
Living people
1953 births
Democratic Alternative (Malta) politicians
Maltese people of Italian descent
20th-century Maltese politicians
21st-century Maltese politicians